The Former Liberation Movements of Southern Africa (FLMSA) is an association of six socialist political parties which were involved in the African nationalist movements against colonialism and white-minority rule in Southern Africa. It has its roots in the Frontline States, loose coalition of African countries from the 1960s to the early 1990s committed to ending apartheid and white minority rule in South Africa and Rhodesia. Its original members are the African National Congress (South Africa), Chama Cha Mapinduzi (Tanzania), FRELIMO (Mozambique), the MPLA (Angola), SWAPO (Namibia), and ZANU–PF (Zimbabwe). In 2019, the Botswana Democratic Party, the ruling party of Botswana, joined the FLMSA.

Members

Summits

See also 

 Southern African Development Community
 Frontline States

References

External links
6th Meeting in Tanzania
Communique on the meeting of the Heads of Political parties of former liberation movements, March 2013

African National Congress
Chama Cha Mapinduzi
FRELIMO
MPLA
SWAPO
ZANU–PF
Independence movements
National liberation movements in Africa
Political internationals

Political organizations based in Africa
Southern Africa